Rama Madhav is a 2014 Indian Marathi-language historical drama directed by Mrinal Kulkarni, It takes place during the Peshwa era. 
Rama Madhav was released on 8 August 2014.

Plot
The story starts from where Chhoti Rama is playing. All she knows as a child is that she was married to the son of a Peshwa. As a child, Rama enters Shaniwarwada for the first time wearing saree and at a very young age she has a responsibility. Nanasaheb Peshwa, who was devastated by the defeat at Panipat and was disappointed by Vishwasrao's death, Madhavrao gets the post of Peshwa at very young age.

Cast
 Alok Rajwade as Madhavrao I
 Parna Pethe as Ramabai Peshwa
 Ravindra Mankani as Peshwa Nanasaheb
 Mrinal Kulkarni as Gopikabai
 Prasad Oak as Raghunathrao
 Sonalee Kulkarni as Anandibai
 Amol Kolhe as Sadashivrao Bhau
 Shruti Marathe as Parvatibai
 Shruti Karlekar
 Suchitra Bandekar
 Aditi Rao Hydari in special appearance

Critical response
Namita Nivas of Indian Express praised Kulkarni's direction as well as the cinematography, costuming and set design, but felt that the second half of the film was paced too slowly.

References

External links
 

2010s Marathi-language films
Films set in the Maratha Empire
Indian historical drama films
Indian films based on actual events
Films scored by Anand Modak